KGUS-LP (99.1 FM) is a low-power FM radio station licensed to Gunnison, Colorado, United States. The station is currently owned by State of Colorado Telecommunication Services.

References

External links
 

GUS-LP
GUS-LP